Agri may refer to:

Places
 Ağrı Province, eastern Turkey
 Ağrı, the capital city of the province
 Ağrı, the Turkish name for Mount Ararat in Turkey
 Ağrı Subregion, Turkey, a statistical subregion
 Ağrı (electoral district), an electoral district of the Grand National Assembly of Turkey
 Agri (river), southern Italy
 Ağrı, Azerbaijan, a village and municipality

People
 Agri (Maeotae), an ancient tribe in the Caucasus region
 Antonio Agri (1932–1998), Argentine classical and tango violinist
 Sanjana Agri, Indian politician
 Syaffarizal Mursalin Agri (born 1992), Indonesian footballer

Other uses
 Agri (caste), a Hindu caste in the state of Maharashtra, India
 Agri dialect, spoken in parts of western India
 Agri Broadcast Network, a former radio network in Ohio, United States
 European Parliament Committee on Agriculture and Rural Development (AGRI)
 Azerbaijan–Georgia–Romania Interconnector (AGRI), a proposed project to transport Azerbaijani natural gas to Romania and further to Central Europe

See also
 Agriș (disambiguation)